Lecithocera dicentropa is a moth in the family Lecithoceridae. It was described by Edward Meyrick in 1938. It is found in North Kivu province of the Democratic Republic of the Congo.

References

Moths described in 1938
dicentropa